SS Telfair Stockton was a Liberty ship built in the United States during World War II. She was named after Telfair Stockton, an American entrepreneur and developer in Jacksonville, Florida.

Construction
Telfair Stockton was laid down on 24 October 1944, under a Maritime Commission (MARCOM) contract, MC hull 2507, by the St. Johns River Shipbuilding Company, Jacksonville, Florida; and was launched on 23 November 1944.

History
She was allocated to the R.A. Nichol & Company, on 30 November 1944. On 30 April 1946, she was laid up in the National Defense Reserve Fleet, Suisun Bay, California. She was sold for commercial use, 24 April 1947, to Oro Navigation Co. She was withdrawn from the fleet, 29 May 1947

References

Bibliography

 
 
 
 

 

Liberty ships
Ships built in Jacksonville, Florida
1944 ships
Suisun Bay Reserve Fleet